Treacy is a surname of Irish origin. It means "fighter". Below are many famous Treacys 
Billy Treacy (contemporary), Irish rugby league player
Carolyn Treacy (born 1982), American Winter Olympics athlete
Colman Treacy (b. 1949), Judge, lawyer
Darren Treacy (rugby league) (born 1971), Australian former rugby league footballer
Darren Treacy (footballer) (born 1970), English former footballer
Eric Treacy (1907-1978), Anglican Bishop and railway photographer.
Emerson Treacy (1900–1967), American stage and film actor
Jim Treacy (contemporary), Irish hurler
John Patrick Treacy (1891–1964), American Roman Catholic Bishop of La Crosse, Wisconsin
John Treacy (b. 1957), Irish Olympic track and field athlete
Keith Treacy (b. 1988), Irish professional football player
Noel Treacy (b. 1951), Irish politician; TD for Galway East
Patrick Ambrose Treacy (1834–1912), Irish Roman Catholic missionary to Australia and New Zealand
Philip Treacy (b. 1967), Irish milliner; designed hats for the wedding of Prince Charles and Camilla Bowles
Ray Treacy (footballer) (1946-2015), Irish professional football player
Sara Louise Treacy (born 1989), Irish Athlete
Seán Treacy (1895-1920), leader of the IRA during the Irish War of Independence
Seán Treacy (politician) (1923–2018), Irish politician; speaker of Dáil Éireann 1973–77 and 1987–97

External links
 www.TraceyClann.com